Richard Sanford may refer to:
 Richard Sanford (runner), American middle-distance runner
 Richard K. Sanford, American newspaper editor and politician from New York
 Rick Sanford, American football defensive back

See also
 Richard Sandford (disambiguation)